, also called Emichee (えみちぃ), is a Chinese-born Japanese model and retired occasional actress. She debuted in 2005 with Seventeen and remains a prominent figure in the fashion and modelling industry.

Early life and career
An only child, Suzuki was born on September 13, 1985, in Shanghai, China. Her birth name was Wu Ziliang (吴子靚). At the age of 12, she emigrated to Kyoto and became a naturalized Japanese citizen. She changed her name to Emi Suzuki in preparation for her entrance into a public junior high school in Kyoto. When she was 13, she began fashion modeling and professionally the following year. She enrolled at Kyoto Ryoyo High School, but did not graduate.

Suzuki began modeling after it was suggested to her by a classmate. She debuted with Seventeen in 1999 and in the same year she appeared in her first TV commercial for Dancemania Speed 2 alongside Franky Gee. Shortly thereafter, her popularity rose when she made appearances at ready-to-wear open collections for several clothing lines.

2002–2007
In 2002, Suzuki began appearing in designer brands' private collections maintaining strict requirements regarding the body fat percentage (BFP) standard. She was also cast in the music video for Ketsumeishi's 2005 mega-hit song Sakura.

Suzuki had decided to retire from modeling and settled back to Kyoto, but her agency and the publisher Shueisha co-started a new magazine, Pinky; she terminated her contract with Seventeen in 2006. Suzuki became a frequent model with Pinky. To date, all of Suzuki's covers with the magazine have been with her solely, except for one notable exception in a November 2007 issue. Suzuki was featured on the first issue of the magazine.

While working as a model for Pinky and in the non-commercial (professional) scene, she was hired for many other fashion magazines and has modeled for a variety of ads, such as Shiseido, Suntory, Meiji, OPC (for Calorie Mate). Aside from appearing in magazines, ads, and countless private collections, Suzuki has been cast in several TV series, such as The Long Love Letter, The Queen of the Lunch, Water Boys 2, and Yukan Club. Her role in Yukan Club was as a girl named "Karen". "Karen" would become her best known role.

From January to November 2007, Suzuki earned $29 million. Several media sources named Suzuki one of the top ten paid models Japanese models of that year.

2010–present
In January 2010, she made a surprise appearance as an alumnus on Fuji Mezamashi TV'''s "Today's Countdown", a news program which she appeared on in her novice years (2001–2002). Despite having a busy work schedule, she referred to herself as a semi-retired model, and implied that she did not wish to pursue an acting career.

Suzuki has appeared on the first issue of Used Mix Special Edition CLOSET, as one of its three featured models along with Miho Tanaka and Rena Takeshita near the end of 2010.

Weight controversy
In November 2008, a special editorial "The Starving Princess Part 8: Can't Stop, Won't Stop" was published in  Takarajima, a monthly lifestyle magazine. Suzuki was named "The 6th thinnest female model in the 2000s". This editorial further reported her body specifications, which was calculated by several specialists as 5' 9½" (1.77 m), 93 lb (42 kg), and 13.4 (BMI).  According to former models who worked with Suzuki at Seventeen (including Anna Tsuchiya, Naoko Tokuzawa, and Ayano Seki), Suzuki had a large appetite. She is noted for her extremely fast metabolism.

Personal life
Little is known about Suzuki's personal life. She is famous for being very private. She became best friends with Nana Eikura in 2003. Eikura stated: "Emi rarely talks about herself to others, even me."

Although successful models usually avoid appearing on TV shows, Suzuki has made numerous guest appearances on several variety shows in Kyoto, including the KBS quiz show Dance Shuffle''.

Suzuki married a fashion company employee in February 2013. She gave birth to their daughter on October 7, 2013.

References

External links
Profile by Stardust Promotion (Japanese)
emisuzuki.com, an unofficial website which has been named as a source referring Suzuki's BWH by IMDb
her official blog

1985 births
Living people
Chinese emigrants to Japan
Japanese female models
Japanese film actresses
Japanese television actresses
Stardust Promotion artists
Actresses from Shanghai
Chinese film actresses
Chinese television actresses
21st-century Chinese actresses
21st-century Japanese actresses
Chinese female models